RTÉ Digital Radio Sport  was a short-lived Irish radio station broadcasting on DAB only, as part of Raidió Teilifís Éireann (RTÉ)'s digital radio lineup. It played constant rolling sports news in a loop and also carried live sports broadcasts that would generally have been carried on AM services. These were moved to RTÉ Radio 1 Extra in April 2008. The station was removed from DAB shortly afterwards to allow an additional service, RTÉ Pulse to launch without adversely affecting station bandwidth.

External links
 RTÉ Press Release
 The Irish Times

Defunct RTÉ radio stations
Digital Radio Sport